Mihajlo Banjac (born 10 November 1999) is a Serbian football midfielder who plays for Russian club Krasnodar.

Club career
On 15 July 2022, Russian Premier League club FC Krasnodar announced Banjac's transfer. On 20 July 2022, Banjac signed a four-year contract with Krasnodar.

Career statistics

References

1999 births
Footballers from Novi Sad
Living people
Serbian footballers
Association football midfielders
FK Inđija players
FK TSC Bačka Topola players
FC Krasnodar players
Serbian First League players
Serbian SuperLiga players
Russian Premier League players
Serbian expatriate footballers
Expatriate footballers in Russia
Serbian expatriate sportspeople in Russia